Lise-Lotte Rebel (born 23 January 1951) is a bishop of the Church of Denmark. Between 1995 and 2021, she served as the bishop of  the Diocese of Helsingør in the Evangelical Lutheran Church of Denmark. She was the first woman to become a bishop in the Church of Denmark.

Biography 
Rebel studied theology at the University of Copenhagen in 1978. She was then appointed as pastor of Utterslev Church between 1978 and 1980. In 1980 she was transferred to Islev Church until 1987 when she was appointed as pastor of Helsingør Cathedral. She stayed in this position until her election as bishop of the same diocese in 1995.

Lise-Lotte Rebel was awarded the Order of the Dannebrog in 1996 and in 2001 became a Knight of the Order of the Dannebrog. On January 1, 2014 she became the Commander of the Order. She retired in 2021.

External links 
 Diocese of Helsingør

20th-century Danish clergy
21st-century Danish clergy
Danish Lutheran bishops
Women Lutheran bishops
University of Copenhagen alumni
People from Lyngby-Taarbæk Municipality
1951 births
Living people